Professor Edgar Harry Brookes (4 February 1897–22 April 1979) was a South African Liberal senator and South African representative to the League of Nations.

Biography
Brookes was born in Smethwick, England in 1897. He attended Maritzburg College in Natal, South Africa where he matriculated in 1911. He attended the University of South Africa and the London School of Economics.

Some of his early works are noted for stressing the advantages of separate development of the races in South Africa, but it is noted that his views changed during his life. Brookes was involved with the South African Institute of Race Relationsin the 1920s.

He became a senator in 1937 and retired as the senator for Zululand in 1953. Between 1933 and 1945 he was the principal of Adams College. He worked closely with John Dube to achieve common objectives. The school became one of the most important schools for black education.  He was a professor of History and Political Science at the University of Natal.

When the Liberal Party was formed in 1953 he did not at first join it, but changed his mind when Peter Brown and other Liberals were detained in the 1960 State of Emergency, which was imposed after the Sharpeville massacre.

After he retired from teaching at the University of Natal he was ordained as an Anglican priest.

Works 
 History of Native Policy in South Africa (1924)
 The Colour Problems of South Africa (1933)
 The Native Reserves of Natal (with N. Hurwitz) (1957)
 The City of God (1960)
 A History of the University of Natal (1967)
 A South African Pilgrimage (1977)

References

Citations

Sources

External links
Biography at SA History Online
Correspondence and papers at the Killie Campbell Africana Museum in Durban.

1897 births
1979 deaths
Alumni of Maritzburg College
20th-century South African Anglican priests
Liberal Party of South Africa politicians
Members of the Senate of South Africa
University of South Africa alumni
Alumni of the London School of Economics
Academic staff of the University of Natal
British emigrants to the Colony of Natal